Henry Springmann (1859–1936) was a rugby union international who represented England from 1879 to 1887.

Early life
Henry Springmann was born on 1859 in Liverpool. He was educated at Craigmount School, Edinburgh.

Rugby union career
Following his education, Springmann played for Liverpool Football Club. In 1879 he was selected to play in the Lancashire fifteen, and went on to play for the North v. the South, and then again for England v. Scotland. This international debut was on 10 March 1879 at Edinburgh.

Shortly afterwards Springmann left for America, but returned to England in 1886. In that year he played for Lancashire v. Cheshire and Yorkshire and was once more he was selected to play for the North v. the South. Again, he was included in the English team v. Scotland, this time played at Manchester (Whalley Range) on 5 March 1887. Despite the fact that England did not win the match, Springmann was singled out for his performance and it was noted "most creditably in this great match closed his brilliant career."

References

1859 births
1936 deaths
English rugby union players
England international rugby union players
Rugby union forwards
People educated at Craigmount School
Rugby union players from Liverpool
Liverpool St Helens F.C. players